formerly shortened as HALKEN (derived from its native name), is a Japanese video game developer founded on 21 February 1980. While independent, it has been closely tied with Nintendo throughout its history, and is often referred to as a second-party developer for the company. HAL Laboratory is headquartered in Chiyoda, Tokyo, and it also has a building at Kai, Yamanashi. The company got its name because "each letter put them one step ahead of IBM". The company is most famous for their work on the  Kirby and Mother series, as well as the first two Super Smash Bros. games.

The logo, dubbed  depicts a dog incubating eggs, which has been in use since 1998.

History

HAL Laboratory started off making games for the MSX system and VIC-20. After financial strain brought on from the development of Metal Slader Glory (1991) for the Famicom, Nintendo offered to rescue HAL from bankruptcy on the condition that HAL employee Satoru Iwata was appointed as its president, which he became between 1993 and 2000. Iwata later became president of Nintendo.

The logo 'Inutamago' was commissioned in 1998 by then HAL Laboratory president, Satoru Iwata. This was handled by Shigesato Itoi who went through many different ideas. He went with the theme of 'an unexpected bond...one that brings the birth of something new' which would lead to the idea of a dog incubating eggs in a nest. The actual design was created by Mr. Akiyama of HAL. The design was indoctrinated by HAL Laboratory in 1998 although the reception at first was lukewarm.

In many of its games during the early to mid-1990s it used the name HALKEN, derived from their Japanese name. Some of its early titles were also released as HAL America Inc. (HAI), a North American subsidiary of the company led by Yash Terakura and based in Beaverton, Oregon, USA.

In August 2001, HAL Laboratory and Nintendo established Warpstar, Inc. in a joint venture (where each part owns 50% of the company) with the objective to manage the Kirby IP along with its copyright, which the decision for the creation of the company was mainly for Kirby: Right Back at Ya! anime series. After the end of the anime, the company still exists and now works with license and supervision of the character in games, merchandise and other media.

For years, the company's development center at Tokyo was located within the eighth floor of the Nintendo Tokyo Prefecture Building which itself is located Nihombashi, Chuo-ku, Tokyo, but in August 2003, the company announced that a restructuration was happening and that the development center at the building would be relocated to HAL's main office building in Kanda Suda-cho, Chiyoda-ku, Tokyo. While this change happened on the Tokyo-based company, the Yamanashi part of HAL was unaffected by the changes of the company.

In 2017, HAL Laboratory announced that they would develop and self-publish games for mobile devices with the brand HAL Egg and focusing on completely new characters and franchises, with different types of design than what the developers of the company usually do. The first title launched by them was Part Time UFO. The company released a miniature version of the MZ-80C computer in October 2017 and a miniature version of the PC-8001 in October 2019

In 2020, HAL Laboratory updated their employee numbers from 169 to 195 and the company came back to the new Nintendo Tokyo Building with its main office and the Tokyo development studio, being on the same building along with Nintendo EPD Tokyo, Nintendo PTD Tokyo, 1-Up Studio and Game Freak like a keiretsu. The studio in Yamanashi was unaffected by that move.

List of games

Nintendo systems

Nintendo Entertainment System
 Pinball – (1984) JP (1985) NA (1986) EU
 Golf – (1984) JP (1985) NA (1986) EU
 F1 Race – (1984) JP
 Mach Rider – (1985) JP (1986) NA (1987) EU
 Balloon Fight – (1985) JP (1986) NA (1987) EU
 Lot Lot – (1985) JP
 Othello – (1986) JP (1988) NA
 Joust – (1987) JP (1988) NA
 Defender II – (1987) JP (1988) NA
 Air Fortress – (1987) JP (1989) NA, EU
 Satsui no Kaisou: Power Soft Renzoku Satsujin Jiken (1988) JP
 Jumbo Ozaki no Hole in One Professional – (1988) JP
 Vegas Dream – (1988) JP (1990) NA
 Rollerball – (1988) JP (1990) NA
 Millipede – (1988) JP, NA
 Adventures of Lolo – (1989) NA (1991) EU
 Adventures of Lolo 2 – (1990) JP, NA (1991) EU
 Uchuu Keibitai SDF – (1990) JP
 Adventures of Lolo 3 – (1990) JP (1991) NA (1992) EU
 New Ghostbusters II – (1990) JP (1991) EU
 Kabuki Quantum Fighter – (1991) NA (1992) EU
 Metal Slader Glory – (1991) JP
 Earthbound Beginnings - (1989) JP
 Day Dreamin' Davey – (1992) NA
 Kirby's Adventure – (1993) JP, NA, EU
 Skyscraper
 Joy Radar (RF hardware unit for wireless Audio/Video from the game unit to the monitor)

Family Computer Disk System
 Gall Force: Eternal Story (1986)
 Eggerland (1986)
 Fire Bam (1988)
 Famicom Grand Prix II: 3D Hot Rally (1988)
 Eggerland: Souzouhe no Tabidachi (1989)

Game Boy
 Revenge of the 'Gator – (1989) JP, NA, EU
 Shanghai – (1989) JP (1990) NA
 Ghostbusters II – (1989) EU (1990) JP, NA
 Trax – (1991) EU, JP, NA
 Kirby's Dream Land – (1992) JP, NA, EU
 Kirby's Pinball Land – (1993) JP, NA, EU
 Adventures of Lolo – (1994) JP (1995) EU
 Vegas Stakes – (1995) NA, EU
 Kirby's Dream Land 2 – (1995) JP, NA, EU
 Kirby's Star Stacker – (1997) JP, NA, EU

Super NES
 HAL's Hole in One Golf (1991)
 SimCity (1991)
 Hyper Zone (1991)
 Arcana (1992)
 NCAA Basketball (Super Dunk Shot in Japan and World League Basketball in Europe) (1992)
 Vegas Stakes (1993)
 Alcahest (1993)
 EarthBound (Mother 2 in Japan) (1994) JP (1995) NA
 Kirby's Dream Course (1994) JP (1995) NA, EU
 Kirby Super Star (1996)
 Shigesato Itoi's No. 1 Bass Fishing (1997)
 Kirby's Dream Land 3 (1997)
 Kirby no Kirakira Kizzu (1998)
 Metal Slader Glory: Director's Cut (2000)

Nintendo 64
 Pocket Monsters' Stadium (1998) JP
 Pokémon Snap (1999)
 Pokémon Stadium (1999) JP (2000) NA, EU
 Super Smash Bros. (1999)
 SimCity 64 (2000) JP (64DD)
 Shigesato Itoi's No. 1 Bass Fishing: Definitive Edition (2000) JP
 Kirby 64: The Crystal Shards (2000)
 Pokémon Stadium 2 (2000) JP (2001) NA, EU
 EarthBound 64 – (cancelled)

Game Boy Color
 Pokémon Pinball – (1999) JP, NA, EU

GameCube
 Super Smash Bros. Melee (2001)
 Kirby Air Ride (2003)
 Kirby Tilt 'n' Tumble 2 (cancelled)
 Kirby for Nintendo GameCube (cancelled)

Game Boy Advance
 Kirby: Nightmare in Dream Land – (2002) JP, NA (2003) EU
 Kirby & The Amazing Mirror (co-developed with Flagship) – (2004) JP, NA, EU
 Mother 3 (co-developed with Brownie Brown) – (2006) JP
 Battland – (cancelled)
 Luna Blaze – (cancelled)

Nintendo DS
 Kirby Canvas Curse – (2005) JP, NA, EU
 Common Sense Training – (2006) JP
 Kirby: Squeak Squad (co-developed with Flagship) – (2006) JP, NA (2007) EU
 Pokémon Ranger (co-developed with Creatures Inc.) – (2006) JP, NA, AUS (2007) EU
 Kirby Super Star Ultra – (2008) JP, NA, AUS (2009) EU
 Picross 3D – (2009) JP (2010) NA, EU
 Face Pilot (DSiWare) – (2010) JP, NA, EU
 Kirby Mass Attack – (2011) JP, NA, EU

Wii
 Minna no Joushiki Ryoku TV
 TV no Tomo G Guide for Wii
 Kirby's Return to Dream Land (2011)
 Kirby's Dream Collection (2012)

Nintendo 3DS
 Face Raiders (2011)
 Kirby: Triple Deluxe (2014)
 Kirby Fighters Deluxe (2014)
 Dedede's Drum Dash Deluxe (2014)
 BoxBoy! (2015)
 Picross 3D: Round 2 (2015)
 BoxBoxBoy! (2016)
 Kirby: Planet Robobot (2016)
 Bye-Bye BoxBoy! (2017)
 Team Kirby Clash Deluxe (2017)
 Kirby's Blowout Blast (2017)
 Kirby Battle Royale (2017)

Wii U
 Kirby and the Rainbow Curse (2015)

Nintendo Switch
 Kirby Star Allies (2018)
 Super Kirby Clash (2019) (co-developed with Vanpool)
 BoxBoy! + BoxGirl! (2019)
 Kirby Fighters 2 (2020) (co-developed with Vanpool)
 Part Time UFO (2020)
 Kirby and the Forgotten Land (2022)
 Kirby's Dream Buffet (2022)
 Kirby's Return to Dream Land Deluxe (2023) (co-developed with Vanpool)

Other systems

VIC-20
 Alien
 Avenger (Space Invaders clone)
 Jelly Monsters (Pac-Man clone)
 Jupiter Lander (Lunar Lander clone)
 Mole Attack
 Money Wars
 Pin Ball (Cutie Q clone)
 Poker
 Radar Rat Race (Rally-X clone)
 Road Race (Night Driver clone)
 Slot Machine
 Star Battle (Galaxian clone programmed by Satoru Iwata; ex-CEO of Nintendo and HAL Laboratory)

Commodore MAX Machine/Commodore 64
 Avenger
 Billiards
 Bowling
 Clowns
 Gorf
 Jupiter Lander
 Kickman
 Le Mans
 Max Basic
 Mini Basic Max
 Mole Attack
 Money Wars
 Music Composer
 Music Machine
 Omega Race
 Pinball Spectacular
 Poker
 Radar Rat Race
 Road Race
 Ski (aka Slalom)
 Super Alien
 Wizard of Wor

MSX
 Balance
 Butamaru Pants
 Cue Star
 Dragon Attack
 Dunk Shot
 Eggerland Mystery
 Eggerland 2
 Fruit Search
 Gall Force
 Heavy Boxing
 Hole in One
 Hole in One Professional
 Inside the Karamaru
 Inspecteur Z
 Mobile Planet Stillus/The Roving Planet Stillus
 Mr. Chin
 Pachipro Densetsu
 Picture Puzzle
 Rollerball
 Space Maze Attack
 Space Trouble
 Step Up
 Super Billiards
 Super Snake
 Swimming Tango
 Tetsuman

MSX2
 Hole in One Special
 Zukkoke Yajikita Onmitsudoutyuu
 Mr. Ninja – Ashura's Chapter

Windows
 Eggerland Episode 0: Quest of Rara
 Egger Land for Windows 95
 Revival! Eggerland

Mobile
 Part Time UFO (2017)
 Housuu de Shoubu! Kame Sanpo (2019)

Computer animation
 Pokémon: The Movie 2000 (CG Tool Development)

Notes

References

External links
 

 
Nintendo
Video game companies of Japan
Video game development companies
Video game publishers
Video game companies established in 1980
Super Smash Bros.
Kirby (series)
Mother (video game series)